The Émile Ollivier ministry was the penultimate government of the  Second French Empire. Led by Émile Ollivier, a republican opponent of the Empire, it was initially composed of moderate  bonapartists and orléanists. However following the constitutional referendum on 8 May liberal members of the cabinet resigned and were replaced with politicians of a more authoritarian type. It lasted from 2 January 1870 until 10 August 1870, on the outbreak of the Franco-Prussian War, when it was replaced by the Cousin-Montauban ministry. It was often referred to at the time as the Ministry of 2 January.

Composition

References

 
1870 in France
Cabinets established in 1870
Cabinets disestablished in 1870
1870 01